The TVR Sagaris is a sports car designed and built by the British manufacturer TVR in their factory in Blackpool, Lancashire.

Overview

The Sagaris made its debut at the MPH03 Auto Show in 2003. The pre-production model was then shown at the 2004 Birmingham Motor Show. In 2005, the production model was released for public sale at TVR dealerships around the world. Based on the TVR T350, the Sagaris was designed with endurance racing in mind. The multitude of air vents, intake openings, and other features on the bodywork allow the car to be driven for extended periods of time on race tracks with no modifications required for cooling and ventilation. The final production model came with several variations from the pre-production show models, e.g. the vents on the wings are not cut out, different wing mirrors, location of the fuel filler, and bonnet hinges (along with other variations).

As with all TVRs of the 1990s and early 2000s, the Sagaris ignores the European Union guideline that all new cars should be fitted with ABS and at least front airbags, because Peter Wheeler believed that such devices promote overconfidence and risk the life of a driver in the event of a rollover—which TVRs are engineered to resist. It also eschews electronic driver's aids (such as traction control or electronic stability control), leading Malcolm Thorne of Classic & Sports Car magazine to observe that although "far less intimidating than you might expect, in the wet it sends a prickle of trepidation down your spine". Thorne nonetheless summed up the TVR as "stunning".

The car's name comes from the sagaris, the Greek name of a lightweight battle-axe used by the Scythians, which was feared for its ability to penetrate the armor of their enemies. The car was designed by Graham Browne.

Daniel Boardman, the Chief Engineer involved in the Sagaris project, was frustrated with well-known TVR quality issues, such as water ingress, carpets coming unstuck, and tricky handling. Boardman spent considerable time ensuring the Sagaris was engineered properly from the start. The suspension was designed to eliminate bump-steer, the dampers were tuned with input from the Bilstein and Multimatic, the bonnet was redesigned to work as well as any conventional steel bonnet, and door seals were meticulously checked to ensure no water ingress. Motoring journalist Jeremy Clarkson described the resulting product as "the best TVR ever made".

In 2008, TVR unveiled the Sagaris 2, which was designed to replace the original Sagaris. The prototype had minor changes to the original car, including a revised rear fascia and exhaust system, and modifications to the interior.

A company called Grex Automotive acquired the forms and tools after TVR's bankruptcy. In 2018, they made the TVR Sagaris available to buy as a kit car. Only ten examples were planned, and the engine and transmission choice were up to the buyers.

Specifications

Powerplant
Engine type: Sagaris TVR Speed Six engine
Displacement: 
Power output:  at 7000 rpm
Torque output:  at 5000 rpm
Bore x stroke: 
Compression ratio: 12.2:1
Valvetrain setup: DOHC 4 valves per cylinder
Camshaft duration: inlet 264, exhaust 264 standard

Gearbox
Transmission: 5-speed manual

Suspension
Front: Independent, double wishbones, coil-over gas dampers, sway bars
Rear: Independent, double wishbones, coil-over gas dampers, sway bars

Brakes
Front:  ventilated disc brakes
Rear:  ventilated disc brakes

Wheels and tires
Wheels: 18 x 8.5 in aluminium alloy Spider wheels
Tires: 255/35 

Chassis/body
Body panels: Glass Reinforced Plastic
Weight: 
Length: 
Width: 
Height: 

Performance
Top speed: 
0 to : 3.7 seconds
60 to 0 mph: 2.9 seconds

Racing

A TVR Sagaris was entered in the 2011 British GT Cup by Team Winstanley, driven by Danny Winstanley. The car entered had a standard factory chassis, but was fitted with an upgraded  TVR Supersport Speed Six engine. In its first season it achieved two wins at Oulton Park and Brands Hatch.

GTF Sagaris cars have won in the TVR Challenge (every race entered), GT Cup, Britcar and the Ardennes Challenge at Spa. As well as many club sport races. GTF02 remains the most successful car with over 40 race wins and 3 Championship outright wins.

References

External links

TVR website

Sagaris
Sports cars
Rear-wheel-drive vehicles
Coupés
Cars introduced in 2004